Sir Conrad Frederick Heron, KCB, OBE (21 February 1916 - 22 July 2019) was an English civil servant. Born to a British father and Swedish mother, Heron was educated at Trinity Hall, Cambridge. He entered the civil service in 1938 as an official in the Ministry of Labour, but his career was interrupted by service in the Royal Navy during the Second World War. Returning to the Ministry of Labour, he was private secretary to the minister in 1953, and went on to work in the industrial relations and overseas departments. He was appointed deputy secretary in the Ministry's successor, the Department of Employment, in 1968; after serving as deputy chairman of the Commission on Industrial Relations from 1971 to 1972, he returned to the Department of Employment as Second Permanent Secretary in 1973 and then served as Permanent Secretary from 1973 to 1976, which coincided with the Three-Day Week. In her autobiography, Shirley Williams called Heron the "peerless" leader of "a remarkable team of conciliators and arbitrators" during that period of intense industrial unrest.

References 

1916 births
2019 deaths
English civil servants
Alumni of Trinity Hall, Cambridge
Knights Companion of the Order of the Bath
Officers of the Order of the British Empire
English centenarians
Men centenarians
Royal Navy personnel of World War II